Henry John Frederick Peters (1881 – 16 December 1918) was an Australian politician.

He was born in Wagga Wagga to miner Heening Peters and his wife Margaritha. He attended primary school at Temora but left at a young age to work as a compositor on the local newspaper. From 1904 to 1906 he owned and edited the Grenfell Vedette, but the paper failed. In 1907 he was elected as a Labor member of the New South Wales Legislative Assembly, representing Deniliquin, transferring to Canterbury in 1913. He was declared bankrupt in 1914, and so forfeited his seat. In 1916 he tried unsuccessfully to enlist in the Australian Imperial Force, being declared unfit on grounds of insufficient eyesight. He enlisted in April 1917 under the assumed name of Henry Edward Murray. In December 1918 he died at the military hospital in Tidworth, Wiltshire, England from Acute Atrophy Liver.

References

 

1881 births
1918 deaths
Australian Army soldiers
Military personnel from New South Wales
Members of the New South Wales Legislative Assembly
Australian Labor Party members of the Parliament of New South Wales
20th-century Australian politicians
Australian military personnel killed in World War I